Wiebke Kethorn (born 10 August 1985) is a German team handball player. She plays for the club VfL Oldenburg, and on the German national team. She represented Germany at the 2013 World Women's Handball Championship in Serbia.

References

German female handball players
1985 births
Living people
People from Nordhorn
Sportspeople from Lower Saxony
20th-century German women
21st-century German women